Below is a list of hunchbacks in fiction.

Quasimodo in The Hunchback of Notre-Dame (1831). He was born with a hunchback and feared by the townspeople as a sort of monster but he finds sanctuary in an unlikely love that is fulfilled only in death.
Manthara in the Ramayana. She was the maid who convinced Queen Kaikeyi that the throne of Ayodhya belonged to her son Bharata and that her step-son crown-prince Rama (the hero of the Ramayana) should be exiled from the kingdom.
Gru in Despicable Me.
Salad Fingers in Salad Fingers.
Jean Cadoret in Jean de Florette and Manon des Sources.
Fritz in Frankenstein and 1823 play Presumption: or the Fate of Frankenstein; he is an assistant of Dr. Frankenstein. In other productions, he is typically named Igor.
Karl in the 1935 film Bride of Frankenstein; he is one of Dr. Septimus' Pretorius' cronies.
Riff Raff in the Rocky Horror Picture Show (1975); he is a hunch-backed servant of Dr. Frank N. Furter and sometimes serves as a lab assistant of this scientist.
Edgar "E" Gore from 2012 animated film Frankenweenie; he is a hunch-backed child and ally of Victor Frankenstein.
Modo from The Hunchback Assignments books series by Arthur Slade; as a child he was traveling with a freak show, but later was rescued by mysterious Mr. Socrates, and, after a couple years (reaching the age of fourteen) he was forced to start living on the streets of London.
Dr. Heinz Doofenshmirtz from cartoon series Phineas and Ferb; a bumbling, incompetent and forgetful evil scientist intent on conquering the local region known as the "tri-state area" through creating obscure inventions.
Harold Allnut from DC Comics; he is a mute aide of Batman, and has proved to be very gifted in terms of technology and electronics.
Richard III from the eponymous Shakespeare play.
Rigoletto from opera Rigoletto by Giuseppe Verdi; he is a court jester.
Barquentine from Mervyn Peake Gormenghast (series); he is the son of Sourdust, the Master of Ritual of Gormenghast castle.
The title character from the telenovela Rina.
Pastor Galswells from Corpse Bride; he is a haughty and bad-tempered priest who is hired to conduct Victor and Victoria's marriage.
Jaclyn/Heidi in the 2008 cartoon Igor (film); she is a hunchbacked female, but can transform in guise of many beautiful women.
Tom from Harry Potter book and film series; he is a landlord, innkeeper, and barman of the Leaky Cauldron.
Philip Wakem from "The Mill on the Floss" by George Eliot
Lumpy Addams from The Addams Family
Ephialtes of Trachis from 300
Jack Dudley from the 1892 children's novel Jack the Hunchback by James Otis
Yennefer of Vengerberg from The Witcher (TV series); before becoming a powerful sorceress she was a hunchback whose deformities were fixed magically 
 The 1920 novel The Tower of the Seven Hunchbacks and its 1944 film adaptation feature nefarious hunchback living under Madrid.
Cousin Lymon in the 1951 novella The Ballad of the Sad Cafe by Carson McCullers.

 
hunchbacks